In pregnancy, there is an increased susceptibility and/or severity of several infectious diseases.

General determinants
There are several potential risk factors or causes to this increased risk:
 An increased immune tolerance in pregnancy to prevent an immune reaction against the fetus.
 Maternal physiological changes including a decrease in respiratory volumes and urinary stasis due to an enlarging uterus.
 The presence of a placenta for pathogens to use as a habitat, such as by L. Monocytogenes and P. falciparum.

Examples
Pregnant women are more severely affected by influenza, hepatitis E, herpes simplex and malaria. The evidence is more limited for coccidioidomycosis, measles, smallpox, and varicella. Pregnancy may also increase susceptibility for toxoplasmosis.

During the 2009 H1N1 pandemic, as well as during interpandemic periods, women in the third trimester of pregnancy were at increased risk for severe
disease, such as disease requiring admission to an intensive care unit or resulting in death, as compared with women in an earlier stage of pregnancy.

For hepatitis E, the case fatality rate among pregnant women has been estimated to be between 15% and 25%, as compared with a range of 0.5 to 4% in the population overall, with the highest susceptibility in the third trimester.

Primary herpes simplex infection, when occurring in pregnant women, has an increased risk of dissemination and hepatitis, an otherwise rare complication in immunocompetent adults, particularly during the third trimester. Also, recurrences of herpes genitalis increase in
frequency during pregnancy.

The risk of severe malaria by Plasmodium falciparum is three times as high in pregnant women, with a median maternal mortality of 40% reported in studies in the Asia–Pacific region. In women where the pregnancy is not the first, malaria infection is more often asymptomatic, even at high parasite loads, compared to women having their first pregnancy. There is a decreasing susceptibility to malaria with increasing parity, probably due to immunity to pregnancy-specific antigens. Young maternal age and increases the risk. Studies differ whether the risk is different in different trimesters. Limited data suggest that malaria caused by Plasmodium vivax is also more severe during pregnancy.

Severe and disseminated coccidioidomycosis has been reported to occur in increased frequency in pregnant women in several reports and case series, but subsequent large surveys, with the overall risk being rather low.

Varicella occurs at an increased rate during pregnancy, but mortality is not higher than that among men and non-pregnant women.

Listeriosis mostly occurs during the third trimester, with Hispanic women appearing to be at particular risk. Listeriosis is a vertically transmitted infection that may cause miscarriage, stillbirth, preterm birth, or serious neonatal disease.

Some infections are vertically transmissible, meaning that they can affect the embryo, fetus, or baby.

See also
 Vertically transmitted infection

References

Obstetrics
Infections specific to the perinatal period